Kuno Werner (10 May 1925 – 8 September 2004) was a German skier. He competed at the 1956 Winter Olympics and the 1960 Winter Olympics.

References

External links
 

1925 births
2004 deaths
German male biathletes
German male cross-country skiers
Olympic biathletes of the United Team of Germany
Olympic cross-country skiers of the United Team of Germany
Biathletes at the 1960 Winter Olympics
Cross-country skiers at the 1956 Winter Olympics
Cross-country skiers at the 1960 Winter Olympics
People from Suhl
Sportspeople from Thuringia